Capeta tridens is a species of jumping spider in the family Salticidae. It is found in Brazil.

References

Further reading

 

Sitticini
Articles created by Qbugbot
Spiders described in 2005